Debby Willemsz (born 10 May 1994) is a Dutch water polo player for CN Mataró and the Dutch national team.

She participated at the 2018 Women's European Water Polo Championship.

See also
 List of World Aquatics Championships medalists in water polo

References

1994 births
Living people
Dutch female water polo players
Water polo goalkeepers
Dutch expatriate sportspeople in Spain
Expatriate water polo players
Water polo players at the 2020 Summer Olympics
Olympic water polo players of the Netherlands
21st-century Dutch women